The brinquinho is a musical instrument from Madeira, Portugal. It's the main musical instrument used in the Folklore dance the Bailinho da Madeira.

It consists of a set of wooden dolls dressed in costumes typical of Madeira, accompanied by Castanets hanging on the wooden dolls backs and in the middle is a reed, which is moved by vertical movements.

References

External links
Brinquinho da Madeira 
Madeiran culture
Portuguese folklore
Portuguese musical instruments
Portuguese words and phrases
Wooden dolls